Princess Disneymania is Disney's first compilation album in the Disneymania series. It was released on September 30, 2008. The album features various artists renditions of classic songs originally from the Disney Princess films. Emily Osment's cover of "Once Upon a Dream", is the only previously unreleased song on the compilation, the song was also used to promote Sleeping Beautys Platinum Edition home video release, which was released the following month. Kari Kimmel, Amy Adams, and Sierra Boggess' contributions on the compilation were all taken from their respective soundtrack albums Ella Enchanted, Enchanted, and The Little Mermaid: Original Broadway Cast Recording, all the other songs on the compilation were previously released on a Disneymania album and are mainly sung by female artists. The album became the lowest-peaking of the series, peaking at #191 on the Billboard 200.

Track listing

Critical reception
Allmusic said "This collection features an assortment of beloved songs from classic Disney tales of love and enchantment performed by the biggest names in pop music. Standouts include former Mouseketeer Christina Aguilera’s career-making ballad, "Reflection," from MULAN; Raven-Symone delivering an almost brassy take on the always uplifting "Under the Sea" from THE LITTLE MERMAID; and delightful Oscar-nominated actress Amy Adams's sprightly take on a "Happy Working Song" from ENCHANTED."

Charts

References

Disneymania albums
Disney Princess
Walt Disney Records compilation albums
2008 compilation albums